Dromedarii were camel-riding auxiliary forces recruited in the desert provinces of the Late Roman Empire in Syria.

They were developed to take the place of horses, where horses were not common. They were also successful against enemy horses, as horses are typically afraid of camels' scents. Camels were seen as exotic and useful creatures, known for their ability to move over desert terrain. It is noted that dromedaries were used less often than bactrians, though the title "Dromedarii" may imply that dromedaries were used more often. However, the Romans could not distinguish between bactrians and dromedaries, thus using both as a means of transportation. This is very similar to the camel cavalry used often by the Ottoman Empire. It is noted that camel cavalry was more commonplace as a result of the desert terrain during the Muslim conquests.

A 1,000-strong dromedarii unit, ala I Ulpia Dromedariorum milliaria, was established by Trajan in Syria. A small number of dromedarii is recorded as part of the Cohors XX Palmyrenorum based in Dura-Europos in Roman Syria.

Notes

References

Late Roman military units
Types of cavalry unit in the army of ancient Rome
Camel cavalry